Wilhelmus Abraham Remmerswaal (March 8, 1954 – July 24, 2022) was a relief pitcher in Major League Baseball. Born in The Hague, Netherlands, Remmerswaal was the first European-trained player to reach the majors. He was the second Dutch-born major-leaguer of the modern (post-1900) era, with Bert Blyleven being the first. Blyleven, however, grew up and learned the game in California.

Biography
Remmerswaal, who batted and threw right-handed, was signed by the Boston Red Sox as an amateur free agent in 1974. He made his major league debut in 1979. In a total of fifty-five and two-thirds innings of work, all in relief, Remmserswaal compiled a 3–1 record with 36 strikeouts and a 5.50 earned run average. Remmerswaal picked up his first major league win on August 15, 1979, when he and a series of other Boston relievers combined to defeat the Milwaukee Brewers 19–5.

In total, Remmerswaal pitched in 22 games over two seasons with Boston, making his final Major League appearance on October 5, 1980. 

During his time in America, he became known for his eccentric behavior.

Following his major league career, Remmerswaal played one season of Triple-A and pitched for the Pawtucket Red Sox in the longest game in professional baseball history. He later spent five years pitching in Italy.

In 1997, Remmerswaal lapsed into a coma after contracting double pneumonia with pleurisy. He lived in a nursing home in the Netherlands. He died July 27, 2022.

References

External links

1954 births
2022 deaths
Boston Red Sox players
Bristol Red Sox players
Dutch expatriate baseball players in Italy
Dutch expatriate baseball players in the United States
Expatriate baseball players in San Marino
Major League Baseball pitchers
Major League Baseball players from the Netherlands
Nettuno Baseball Club players
Parma Baseball Club players
Pawtucket Red Sox players
Sportspeople from The Hague
T & A San Marino players
Winter Haven Red Sox players